Chido Cleopatra Mpemba (born July 1988) is the Youth Envoy at the African Union Commission. She was appointed as the second African Union Youth Envoy by the chairperson of the African Union Commission Moussa Faki in November 2021, as the youngest senior official in the history of the African Union and youngest diplomat in the chairperson's cabinet. Chido took over from Aya Chebbi from Tunisia. According to the Chairperson of the African Union Commission, Moussa Faki, the role of the AU Youth Envoy is to assist in championing youth development issues in Africa.

Early life and education 
Ms. Mpemba was born in 1988 at the Mbuya Nehanda Maternity Clinic in Harare, was raised in Bulawayo and went to Girls College High School. Prior to enrolling in an MBA program at Midlands State University, she earned her degree in Labour Organisational Psychology and Human Resource Management from Cape Town University in South Africa. She studied Leadership in Business at Dartmouth College during her Mandela Washington Fellowship in 2016.

Career 
Before being appointed to the African Union as the Youth Envoy on 1 November 2021, she had worked as a banker at Standard Chartered Bank, and also worked for the Ministry of Youth  Arts, Sport, and Recreation in her country, Zimbabwe. She attended fellowships, served on different board, which her listed below:

 Emerging Security Sector Leader (ESSL), Africa Center of Strategic Studies, National Defense University, U.S Department of Defense. 
 Board Member & Trustee, Old Mutual Youth Fund
 Global Leader Council (GLC) Member, GenU Co-chaired by UNICEF Executive Director & PWC Global Chairman.
 Leadership Council Member, AFRICA Reach Chaired by H.E Monica Geingos First Lady of Namibia and Current President of Organisation of Africa First Ladies.
 2016 Mandela Washington Fellow, President Obama’s Young African Leaders Initiative
 Climate Reality Leader, Trained by Former VP U.S Al Gore.
 Former Advisor to Minister of Youth, Sports & Arts for Zimbabwe, World Olympian, Kirsty Coventry
 Global Award winning banker and private sector risk professional at Standard Chartered Bank.

External links 
 Official Twitter handle
 Official Instagram handle

References 

1988 births
Living people
University of Cape Town alumni
People from Bulawayo